Employee of the Month is a talk show about dreamy careers. The host, Catie Lazarus, gives each guest the Employee of the Month Award. Each installment features guests with jobs of interest, ranging from television personalities and musicians to comedians and puppeteers.

Episodes

2011

2012

2013

2014

2015

2016

2017

2018

2019

References

Employee of the Month